Archives of Computational Methods in Engineering is a scholarly journal that provides a forum for spreading results of research and advanced industrial practice in computational engineering with particular emphasis on mechanics and its related areas. It publishes reviews presenting developments in computational engineering.

Subjects covered 
Areas of research published in the journal include modeling; solution techniques and applications of computational methods in areas including liquid and gas dynamics, solid and structural mechanics, biomechanics); variational formulations and numerical algorithms related to implementation of the finite and boundary element methods; finite difference and finite volume methods and other computational methods.

Impact factor 
The journal has a 2020 impact factor of 7.302.

Indexing
Among others, the journal is abstracted and indexed in Google Scholar, Index to Scientific Reviews, Journal Citation Reports/Science Edition, OCLC, Science Citation Index Expanded (SciSearch), SCOPUS, Summon by Serial Solutions, VINITY - Russian Academy of Science]] and Zentralblatt Math.

Editorial board
The editors-in-chief of the journal are Michael Kleiber (Institute of Fundamental Technological Research, Polish Academy of Sciences, Warsaw) and Eugenio Oñate (School of Civil Engineering and CIMNE - Technical University of Catalonia (UPC), Barcelona, Spain).

References

External links
 
Springer
SpringerLink

Computer science journals
Engineering journals
English-language journals
Publications established in 1994
Springer Science+Business Media academic journals